Tárcoles is a district of the Garabito canton, in the Puntarenas province of Costa Rica.

History 
Tárcoles was created on 30 November 1988 by Acuerdo 431. Segregated from Jacó.

Geography 
Tárcoles has an area of  km² and an elevation of  metres.

Demographics 

For the 2011 census, Tárcoles had a population of  inhabitants.

Transportation

Road transportation 
The district is covered by the following road routes:
 National Route 34
 National Route 320

References 

Districts of Puntarenas Province
Populated places in Puntarenas Province